The Behind the Mask Tour was a worldwide concert tour by the British-American pop rock band Fleetwood Mac. The tour began on March 23, 1990, in Brisbane, Australia, and ended on December 7, 1990, in Inglewood, California.

History of the tour 
The band played 101 shows in 13 countries around the world.

This would be the last tour of Christine McVie, Stevie Nicks and Rick Vito with the band; Nicks and Vito would leave the group in 1991 and 1993 respectively, focusing on their solo careers. Meanwhile, McVie retired from touring in 1993 and left the group permanently in 1998. Both Nicks and McVie would later rejoin; in 1997 and 2014 respectively.

The November 2 show in Philadelphia was originally scheduled for July 20, but it was cancelled because Christine McVie's father had died. Before the Boston show, the band showed up at Boston's Hard Rock Cafe, signing autographs and donated a guitar to their memorabilia collection. Fleetwood Mac fans swarmed the place and it was a huge media event in the city.

On the December 6 and 7 concerts in Oakland and Inglewood, Lindsey Buckingham made a guest appearance to play "Landslide" with Nicks during the set, then made another appearance during the set closer "Go Your Own Way" and the first encore number, "Tear It Up", where he engaged in guitar duels with Rick Vito and Billy Burnette.

The Japanese leg of the tour was documented through a television special which was filmed primarily at the Tokyo concerts.

During the tour, a video for the single "Skies the Limit" was filmed. It was shot at the June 13 show in Morrison, Colorado.

The opening acts for the tour were Squeeze, Jethro Tull and Daryl Hall & John Oates.

Set list 
 In the Back of My Mind
 The Chain
 Dreams
 Isn't It Midnight
 Oh Well
 Rhiannon
 Stop Messin' Round
 Save Me
 Gold Dust Woman
 I Loved Another Woman
 Landslide
 World Turning
 Everywhere
 Stand on the Rock
 Little Lies
 Stand Back (Stevie Nicks song)
 You Make Loving Fun
 Go Your Own Way
Encore:
 Tear It Up (Johnny Burnette cover)
 Don't Stop
 Songbird

Tour dates

Personnel 
 Mick Fleetwood – drums, percussion
 John McVie – bass guitar
 Christine McVie – Hammond organ, Yamaha DX7, piano, maracas, vocals
 Rick Vito – lead guitar, vocals
 Billy Burnette – rhythm guitar, vocals
 Stevie Nicks – vocals, tambourine

Additional personnel

 Dan Garfield – keyboards
 Isaac Asanté – percussion
 Lynn Marbry – backing vocals
 Liza Jane Likins – backing vocals
 Sharon Celani – backing vocals

References 

1990 concert tours
Fleetwood Mac concert tours